Cooper Jordan Roth (born September 27, 2000) is an American actor, widely known for his roles as David in the ABC's situation comedy Back in the Game, and as voice of B-Dawg in Super Buddies. Roth first showed interest in acting at the age of four and began to work in community theater and school plays. He has a younger brother, Duncan Roth.

Roth had been busy studying film and TV production at the USC School of Cinematic Arts when the COVID-19 pandemic forced him and his fellow students to abruptly end their on-campus classes and move to online instruction for the rest of the semester.

Filmography

References

External links
 

2000 births
American male child actors
Living people
People from Manhattan Beach, California